Bhupendra Narayan Mandal  (1904-1975) was an Indian politician. He was a Member of Parliament, representing Bihar in the Rajya Sabha the upper house of India's Parliament as a member of  the Samyukta Socialist Party

Biography

Early life 
B.N. Mandal was born in 1904 into landowning Yadav family of Ranipatti Estate in modern day Madhepura district of Bihar. His father Babu Jainarayan Mandal and mother Dana Devi were traumatized by the death of his two elder brothers. Thus, they were very protective towards him.

Death 
Bhupendra Mandal took his last breath on 29 May 1975 at Tengraha in Kumarkhand block of Madhepura.

References

External links
Official biographical sketch in Parliament of India website

Rajya Sabha members from Bihar
India MPs 1962–1967
Lok Sabha members from Bihar
Samyukta Socialist Party politicians
Praja Socialist Party politicians
1904 births
1975 deaths